The Young Artists Forum (YAF) is a Palestinian non-governmental organization. It was officially established on December 23, 2002, and is located in Ramallah, Palestine. YAF is formally registered with three Palestinian Ministries: the Ministry of the Interior, the Ministry of Culture, and the Ministry of Education and Higher Education.  The YAF has a Fine Art evening school for the talented of all ages, and its curriculum is certified by the Ministry of Education and Higher Education.  Each course has a graduation certificate which is recognized by the Ministry of Education and Higher Education. 

The YAF supports few main activities: 
- The evening school for teaching visual arts to all age groups. Some of the graduates of YAF school are prize winning artists.  
- Implementing rehabilitation projects through art that target children and youth who were a subject of, or had witnessed a Traumatic Experience in marginalized villages.
- Provide courses and workshops for artists interested in Illustrating Children's Books. Some of the books have been published by Tamer Institute for Community Education.
- Provide training courses and workshops for teachers of art education in schools.

External links
 Young Artists Forum Official Website

Organizations based in the State of Palestine
Art schools in the State of Palestine
Schools in the West Bank